Canal 11 Televisión was a short-lived television channel based in Caracas, Venezuela.  It first went on the air in December 1966 and ceased operations due to bankruptcy less than two years later.

History
On July 27, 1966, Canal 11 Televisión was installed in Caracas.  The station's founders were brothers Ricardo and Amable Espina (Amable Espina was a director at Radio Caracas Televisión).  It was inaugurated in December of that same year.

On May 22, 1968, the Second Tribunal in the Mercantile Jurisdiction of Venezuela decreed the bankruptcy of Canal 11 Televisión, which, by mid 1967, ran into financial problems.  At the end of that year, the employees of the station had taken over control of the company.

See also
List of Venezuelan over-the-air television networks and stations

References

External links
Detailed history of television in Venezuela  

Defunct television channels and networks in Venezuela
Television channels and stations established in 1966
Television channels and stations disestablished in 1968
Mass media in Caracas